The 1996 Colorado State Rams football team represented Colorado State University in the 1996 NCAA Division I-A football season.

Schedule

References

Colorado State
Colorado State Rams football seasons
Colorado State Rams football